Badr Benoun (also spelt as Badr Banoune; ; born 30 September 1993) is a Moroccan professional footballer who plays as a centre-back for Qatar Stars League club Qatar SC and the Morocco national team. He is nicknamed "Sultan". He started his professional career playing for Raja CA.

Club career

The beginning of the march
Benoun started his career playing for Raja Club Athletic. He won his first trophy with the club after finishing 1st in the 2012–13 Botola. He was loaned out to Wydad de Fès to gain more playing time and experience. He played a total of 16 games before being loaned out again to RS Berkane. In 2015 he was called back to the club.

Raja CA
Benoun's return bought excitement back to the Raja fans. He won his second trophy after defeating Difaâ Hassani El Jadidi in the 2017 Moroccan Throne Cup after scoring a penalty.

2018–2020
In 2018, Raja qualified to play the 2018 CAF Confederation Cup. Raja entered the knock-out stages after topping the group stages. Raja reached to the finals and won the cup. This guaranteed them a spot in the 2019 CAF Super Cup. Raja was to face Espérance Sportive de Tunis the was to take place in Doha. Benoun scored a goal in the 64th minute and won the cup. He also won the 2019–20 Botola and the 2019–20 Arab Club Champions Cup. He spent five seasons with the club before signing with Al Ahly.

Al Ahly
In November 2020, he joined Egyptian club Al Ahly. He represented the club during the FIFA Club World Cup and secured the bronze medal after a victory against Brazilian side Palmeiras. Soon after, he won the 2020 Egypt Cup, the 2021 CAF Champions League and the 2020 CAF Super Cup. He later went on to defeat his former team Raja to win the 2021 CAF Super Cup.

Qatar SC
In July 2022, he signed for Qatari club Qatar SC on a three-year deal.

International career
In 2013, Benoun won a gold medal at the 2013 Islamic Solidarity Games after defeating Indonesia 2–1 in the final.

On 7 October 2017, he made his international debut for Morocco in a 2018 FIFA World Cup qualification match against Gabon at the Stade Mohammed V in Casablanca, replacing Medhi Benatia in a 3–0 victory.

In May 2018, he was named in Morocco's 23-man squad for the 2018 FIFA World Cup in Russia.

On 10 January 2022, Benoun was replaced by Achraf Bencharki for the 2021 Africa Cup of Nations after suffering an injury that would limit his participation in the competition.

On 10 November 2022, he was named in Morocco's 26-man squad for the 2022 FIFA World Cup in Qatar.

Career statistics 
Scores and results list Morocco's goal tally first.

Honours 
Raja CA
Botola: 2012–13, 2019–20
Coupe du Trône: 2017 
CAF Confederation Cup: 2018
CAF Super Cup: 2019

Al Ahly
 Egypt Cup: 2019–20
 FIFA Club World Cup: Third place 2020
 CAF Champions League: 2020–21
 CAF Super Cup: 2021 (May), 2021 (December)

Morocco
Islamic Solidarity Games: 2013
African Nations Championship: 2018

Individual
 African Nations Championship Team of the Tournament: 2018

References

Living people
1993 births
Footballers from Casablanca
Moroccan footballers
Association football central defenders
Morocco international footballers
Morocco A' international footballers
Botola players
Egyptian Premier League players
Qatar Stars League players
Raja CA players
Wydad de Fès players
RS Berkane players
Al Ahly SC players
Qatar SC players
2018 African Nations Championship players
2022 FIFA World Cup players
Moroccan expatriate footballers
Moroccan expatriate sportspeople in Egypt
Expatriate footballers in Egypt
Moroccan expatriate sportspeople in Qatar
Expatriate footballers in Qatar